María del Rosario Valdez Campos (28 May 1945 – 20 June 2016), known professionally as Chayito Valdez, was a Mexican singer and actress who was born in Guasave, Sinaloa, Mexico. She was associated with and contributed to the folk music of Mexico.

Biography
Valdez started her music career at an early age participating in amateur competitions with songs such as "La Cigarra", "Historia de un amor", "La Bikina", and "Leña de Pirul". Her godmother was Amalia Mendoza, a successful singer known as "La Tariácuri", and in the early 1970s, she recorded four songs the Sinaloan city of Los Mochis: "Besos y Copas", "Una Noche me Embriagué", "Una Sombra", and "Amor que Muere", which earned her a reputation as a Mexican folk singer. She won the fifth Festival de la Canción Ranchera with the song "No me pregunten por él".

Valdez moved to Los Angeles, California in 1982 and became a US citizen. On September 17, 1985, she suffered an automobile accident that left her in a wheelchair, but after a long recovery began making public appearances again. In June 2003 she suffered a cerebral hemorrhage and fell into a coma for 50 days. Her last show was in Nogales (a city in the Mexican state of Sonora). She spent her last days in a persistent vegetative state in a hospital in Coronado, California.

Works

Music 
During her 30-year career, Valdez contributed over 300 hits and 1500 recorded songs to the Mexican musical heritage. Her musical legacy includes the following:

Corridos de Caballos (traditional Mexican ballads) 
"El Moro de Cumpas"
"Caballo Prieto Afamado"
"Caballo Prieto Azabache"
"El alazán y el Rocío"
"El Cantador"
"Caballo Tequila"
"Caballo Alazán Lucero"
"Los Dos Alazanes"

Traditional Songs 
"San Juan del Río"
"Mi Soldadita"
"La Gallera"
"Lindo Michoacán"
"El Sinaloense"
"Sonora Querida"
"Acuarela Potosina"
"Pelea de Gallos

Romantic Boleros 

 "Comprendeme"
 "Mía Nomás"
 "Sentencia"
 "Besos Callejeros"
 "No Vuelvas"
 "Ojazos Negros."

Television
Valdez appeared in Mexican television programs such as:
Siempre en Domingo
Noches Tapatías
El Estudio de Lola
Hoy mismo
Para gente Grande
Aun hay más
Nuestra Gente

Film
 Hijos de tigre (1980)
 El charro del misterio (1980)
 Pasión por el peligro (1979)
 La hija del contrabando (1977)
 Tierra de Valientes (1987)
 Caballo Prieto Afamado (1977)
 En el camino Andamos
 Los 4 jinetes del apocalipsis
 Pistoleros famosos II
 El ratero de la vecindad
 Pánico en la Frontera
 Zacazonapan(1976)
 De la Gloria al Infierno
 Hasta el último trago... corazón (documentary 2005)

References

External links
 
 Periódico Región Biography  

1945 births
2016 deaths
Mexican emigrants to the United States
Mexican film actresses
Mexican women singers
People from Guasave
Actresses from Sinaloa
Singers from Sinaloa
People from Chula Vista, California
People with hypoxic and ischemic brain injuries
People with disorders of consciousness
Women in Latin music